Golden Mic Awards 2016 (also GMA2016, Chinese: 金唛奖2016) is a triple radio award ceremony held in Singapore in 2016. It was the 2016 edition of Golden Mic Awards organised by Mediacorp for free-to-air stations Capital 95.8FM, Love 97.2FM and Y.E.S. 93.3FM.

Awards Ceremony

Trivia
Most Popular Group, Most Fashionable DJ and DJ I’d Like to Travel With will be first given out this year.
Marcus Chin holds the most number of nomination, with five.
Seah Kar Huat holds the record for the most nominations without a win, with four.
Dennis Chew, the biggest winner of the ceremony, walked home with three awards: LOVE 97.2FM Most Popular DJ, Most Popular Group and Most Fashionable DJ.

References

Radio in Singapore
Radio awards